Notothlaspi is a genus of flowering plants belonging to the family Brassicaceae.

Its native range is New Zealand.

Species:

Notothlaspi australe 
Notothlaspi rosulatum 
Notothlaspi viretum

References

Brassicaceae
Brassicaceae genera